Theodoor Aenvanck or Theodor Aenvanck (1633 – after 19 April 1690) was a Flemish painter.  He is known for his still lifes of flowers and fruit.

Life
Theodoor Aenvanck was born in Antwerp where he was baptized on 30 November 1633.
He was a pupil of the prominent Dutch still life painter Jan Davidszoon de Heem who resided in Antwerp for a long time. He registered as a pupil of the Antwerp Guild of St. Luke in 1647 and in 1669 he became a master of the Guild.

Aenvanck traveled abroad probably before 1669. He likely left Antwerp again after March 1686. He died after 19 April 1690 but the place of death is not recorded.

Work
Aenvanck was a specialist still life painter who painted flower, fruit, vegetable and fish still lifes.  Only a few works of the artist are currently known.

Notes

External links

1633 births
1690 deaths
Flemish Baroque painters
Flemish still life painters
Artists from Antwerp
Painters from Antwerp